Sherab Palden Beru (1911 – 29 November 2012) was an exiled Tibetan thangka artist who played a key role in preserving the art-form through the training of western students over a period of more than four decades.

Life and work
Born into a nomadic family that had lived in the eastern province of Kham, Tibet, since the mid-15th century, Beru entered the Namgyal Ling monastery at the age of nine. His aptitude for drawing was quickly recognised, and his formal artistic training began from the age of 13, under the guidance of the monastery's artist-lama. Nine years later, he completed his first thangka.

It was whilst studying at Namgyal Ling that Beru attained high levels of skill, not only in Thangka painting, but also in associated monastic disciplines such as ritual music, and Lama dancing in particular. In 1956, after over 30 years of living at the monastery, Beru left for Lhasa, where he stayed for three years, until forced to escape to India following the invasion of Tibet by Chinese forces.
Once in India, Beru began thangka painting again, based for a while in Dalhousie where, amongst other works, he was commissioned by Lokesh Chandra to produce a series of drawings of mandalas for publication. He was then asked by the 16th Karmapa, Rangjung Rigpe Dorje, to make his way to Scotland where Chogyam Trungpa and Akong Tulku Rinpoche had established the first Tibetan Buddhist centre in the west, Kagyu Samye Ling, in Eskdalemuir, Dumfriesshire. Despite having some initial misgivings about leaving the Tibetan community in exile in Northern India so soon after having arrived as a refugee, Beru acceded to the wishes of his Guru.

For the next 35 years, Beru devoted himself to creating thangkas of outstanding quality in the Karma Gadri style, and to training western students in the techniques of thangka painting. His work can be seen in centres through Europe, Asia and North America.
His principal achievements are to be seen at Samye Ling itself, where he designed not only the temple interior but several cycles of exquisite thangkas, depicting variously the Kagyu Lineage holders, Sakyamuni Buddha, Indian mahasiddhas and the Four Directional Guardians. Most notable are the much-copied painting of the Kagyu Lineage Refuge Tree and the painting of the Guru Yoga of the 8th Karmapa, Mikyo Dorje. He painted the thangka of Vajradhara in the Dorje Dzong shrine room in Boulder, Colorado.

The paintings in the temple at Samye Ling are known for their combination of large size and exquisite detail. As in Tibet, many of these paintings took between one and three years to complete. Along with Akong Rinpoche and his students, Beru also helped retrieve, restore and preserve thangkas from Tibet, many of which were destroyed in the early days of the Chinese occupation. Later Beru was joined at Samye Ling by his nephew, Gyamtso Tashi, an ordained monk and sculptor, who reached India after making a three-year pilgrimage on foot across Tibet.

Well into his 90s, Beru no longer contributed directly to the art-work, but remained a leading authority on matters of Tibetan art, and was regularly consulted by practicing thangka artists. He died on 29 November at Samye Ling at an age of about 100. His body was left completely undisturbed in 'Tukdam' meditation for the traditional three-day period after his death.

References

External links

1911 births
2012 deaths
Buddhist artists
Tibetan artists
Tibetan painters
British people of Tibetan descent
Tibetan people
Tibetan centenarians
Men centenarians